Charles M. Goodman House is a historic home located at Alexandria, Virginia. It consists of a two-story 1870s Victorian-era farmhouse with an unusual International Style addition designed by architect Charles M. Goodman in 1954.  Also on the property are the contributing stone-lined well (c. 1870s), a wooden fence (1954), and discontinuous low stone walls (1954).

It was listed on the National Register of Historic Places in 2013.

References

Houses on the National Register of Historic Places in Virginia
Victorian architecture in Virginia
Houses completed in 1954
International style architecture in Virginia
Houses in Alexandria, Virginia
National Register of Historic Places in Alexandria, Virginia